Federico Coria was the defending champion but chose not to defend his title.

Jack Sock won the title after defeating Christian Harrison 6–4, 6–1 in the final.

Seeds

Draw

Finals

Top half

Bottom half

References

External links
Main draw
Qualifying draw

Savannah Challenger - 1
2022 Singles